Sparta is a town in Alleghany County, North Carolina, United States. At the last 2010 census, the population was 1,770 people. It is the county seat of Alleghany County.

History
James H. Parks, an early businessman whose store stood near the present location of the ABC store, was one of three men who donated land for the county seat in 1866. Parks is credited with suggesting the name "Sparta", after the Greek city-state.

Noteworthy businesses established in Sparta included The Alleghany News (1889), the Bank of Sparta (1902), and the second store purchased by home improvement giant Lowe's (1949). Sparta's first shopping center, Trojan Village, opened in 1977, followed by Sparta Plaza in 1986.

The Alleghany County Courthouse and Jarvis House are listed on the National Register of Historic Places.

On August 9, 2020, the town was the epicenter of a moderate earthquake that was felt as far as Georgia. The earthquake, which registered as a 5.1 on the Richter magnitude scale, was the largest earthquake to occur in North Carolina in over 100 years.

Geography
Sparta is located at  (36.505639, -81.121718).

Climate

Demographics

2020 census

As of the 2020 United States census, there were 1,834 people, 732 households, and 409 families residing in the town.

2000 census
As of the census of 2000, there were 1,817 people, 825 households, and 441 families residing in the town. The population density was 765.2 people per square mile (296.0/km). There were 922 housing units at an average density of 388.3 per square mile (150.2/km). The racial makeup of the town was 94.06% White, 1.98% African American, 0.17% Native American, 0.55% Asian, 0.06% Pacific Islander, 2.20% from other races, and 0.99% from two or more races. Hispanic or Latino of any race were 7.71% of the population.

There were 825 households, out of which 22.5% had children under the age of 18 living with them, 39.0% were married couples living together, 12.0% had a female householder with no husband present, and 46.5% were non-families. 41.9% of all households were made up of individuals, and 22.5% had someone living alone who was 65 years of age or older. The average household size was 2.01 and the average family size was 2.71.

In the town, the population was spread out, with 18.1% under the age of 18, 8.3% from 18 to 24, 24.3% from 25 to 44, 25.3% from 45 to 64, and 24.1% who were 65 years of age or older. The median age was 44 years. For every 100 females, there were 85.0 males. For every 100 females age 18 and over, there were 80.1 males.

The median income for a household in the town was $22,474, and the median income for a family was $37,596. Males had a median income of $23,304 versus $18,281 for females. The per capita income for the town was $14,237. About 10.6% of families and 18.3% of the population were below the poverty line, including 17.0% of those under age 18 and 33.0% of those age 65 or over.

Notable locations
 The Sparta Teapot Museum (now permanently closed).

Notable people

 Zach Galifianakis (Oct 1, 1969 - ), American actor, comedian, musician and writer
 Boyden Carpenter (1909–1995), bluegrass artist
 Octavia Jordan Perry (1895–1991), writer; inspired by summers spent in Sparta
 Del Reeves (1932–2007), country singer

In popular culture
 Sparta was stated to be the hometown of Charlotte Simmons in Tom Wolfe's 2004 novel I Am Charlotte Simmons.
 The infamous alternate music video for  "Can't Tell Me Nothing" by musical artist and producer Kanye West was filmed on location in Alleghany County near Sparta, North Carolina. The video stars actor and comedian Zach Galifianakis, as well as indie folk artist Will Oldham. Galifianakis was approached by West following a stand-up comedy show and was asked if he could "produce and perform a video for him". Galifianakis was given complete authority over the content of the video. The video includes several locals, including a young group of female cloggers from the area.

References

External links
 Town of Sparta official website
 Alleghany Chamber of Commerce

Towns in North Carolina
Towns in Alleghany County, North Carolina
County seats in North Carolina